Hillsdale is an unincorporated community in Indiana County, Pennsylvania, United States. Hillsdale has a post office, with ZIP code 15746.

References

Unincorporated communities in Indiana County, Pennsylvania
Unincorporated communities in Pennsylvania